Ylli Shehu (born 13 March 1966) is an Albanian retired football player.

Club career
Shehu made his senior debut for Partizani against Naftëtari Qyteti Stalin in 1984 aged only 16 and he won two Albanian championships in 1987 and 1993 with them. He had been out injured for almost two years from 1990 only to regain fitness and win that second league title.

After that he moved to Croatia and spent several seasons with HNK Šibenik, scoring 40 goals in the Croatian Prva HNL. He also played for Apollon Athens in the Greek Alpha Ethniki and had a season in Belgium with Cercle Brugge.

International career
He made his debut for Albania in a September 1988 friendly match away to Romania and earned a total of 10 caps, scoring 1 goal. His final international was a September 1995 European Championship qualification match against Bulgaria.

Honours
Albanian Superliga: 2
 1987, 1993

References

External links

1966 births
Living people
Footballers from Tirana
Albanian footballers
Association football forwards
Albania international footballers
FK Partizani Tirana players
Apollon Smyrnis F.C. players
HNK Šibenik players
Cercle Brugge K.S.V. players
Kategoria Superiore players
Croatian Football League players
Belgian Pro League players
Albanian expatriate footballers
Expatriate footballers in Greece
Expatriate footballers in Croatia
Expatriate footballers in Belgium
Albanian expatriate sportspeople in Greece
Albanian expatriate sportspeople in Croatia
Albanian expatriate sportspeople in Belgium
Albanian football managers
KF Teuta Durrës managers
FK Partizani Tirana managers
Kategoria Superiore managers